"I Gotta Get to You" is a song written Blaine Larsen, Jim Lauderdale and Jimmy Ritchey, and recorded by American country music artist George Strait. It was released in February 2010 as the 90th single of his career, as well as the third single from his album Twang. The single debuted at #57 on the Billboard Hot Country Songs charts for the week of January 16, 2010, at the time his previous single, "Twang," was still on the charts.

Content
The song's narrator wants to romance his lover, saying to her, "I gotta get to you, 'cause you sure been gettin' to me".

Critical reception
Roughstock reviewer Allen Jacobs' review focuses on how Strait's previous single, "Twang," missed the Top Ten, saying that the song will "return him to his home in the Top Ten."

Charts

Weekly charts

Year-end charts

References

2010 singles
George Strait songs
Songs written by Jim Lauderdale
Song recordings produced by Tony Brown (record producer)
Songs written by Blaine Larsen
MCA Nashville Records singles
Songs written by Jimmy Ritchey
2009 songs